"Second Contact" is the series premiere of Star Trek: Lower Decks. In the episode, characters on the USS Cerritos, one of the "least important ships in Starfleet," must fight off a giant spider monster and a disease that has infected the crew of the ship, all while trying to make second contact with the people on the planet below. The episode received mixed reviews from critics.

Plot 
D'Vana Tendi, an ensign who is new to Starfleet, arrives on the USS Cerritos and is immediately met by fellow ensigns Bradward "Brad" Boimler and Beckett Mariner, who give her the full tour of the lower decks of the ship. After that, Boimler is asked to meet with Captain Carol Freeman specifically. Worried, Boimler enters her office, where she tells him to keep an eye on Mariner, who has been acting up, e.g., getting drunk with Romulan whiskey while at work. But, unbeknownst to Boimler, Mariner is actually Freeman's daughter. Sure enough, while making "second contact" with a very cut-off planet, Boimler catches Mariner smuggling much-needed equipment to humble farmers who live on the planet.

While Boimler and Mariner are arguing, they're attacked by a giant spider. Boimler and Mariner just escape, and Mariner suggests that they use their uniforms as decoys for the monster. When they costume dummies in their clothes, the spider tears apart Boimler's clothes while leaving Mariner's completely untouched. Soon after, the spider gets a hold of Boimler and begins to cover him in slime. Mariner is initially scared, but the farmers tell her that the beast is an herbivore, and is only playing with Boimler. Meanwhile, on the Cerritos, Commander Jack Ransom unknowingly contacts a virus from the planet's surface, and quickly spreads it around to most of the crew, turning them into raging bloodthirsty monsters. Sam Rutherford is on a date with Ensign Barnes at the time, and they fight the monsters together until Rutherford realizes Barnes isn't into the mechanics of the ship, in which he specializes.

Then, chief medical officer T'Ana (who is Caitian as a reference to Star Trek: The Animated Series, in which there was also a Caitian character) finds Boimler and Mariner and quickly deducts that the slime the giant spider beast spread on him is actually an antidote for Ransom's contracted disease. She cures all the crew members, though Boimler chooses to let Mariner off the hook and not report her to Freeman, due to Freeman only wanting Mariner off the ship. Later, Mariner decides to mentor Boimler in hopes that he might become a captain someday.

Production 
Series creator Alex Kurtzman noted that the show was more about what was going on below the bridge, like the Star Trek: The Next Generation episode "Lower Decks". The episode's title was announced in late July 2020, prior to the series premiere, along with three others that serve as the show's first four episodes. Promotional images from the episode were also revealed. "Second Contact" was written by Mike McMahan, who later went on to write the season finale "No Small Parts", and directed by Barry J. Kelly who also directed the fourth, seventh, and tenth episodes, respectively.

"Second Contact" stars Tawny Newsome as Beckett Mariner, Jack Quaid as Brad Boimler, Noël Wells as D'Vana Tendi, and Eugene Cordero as Sam Rutherford, as well as featuring Dawnn Lewis, Jerry O'Connell, Fred Tatasciore, and Gillian Vigman as secondary-main characters Carol Freeman, Jack Ransom, Shaxs, and T'Ana, respectively. The episode also serves as the debut of Jessica McKenna's character, Ensign Barnes, who goes on a date with Rutherford in the episode, and Paul Scheer's Andy Billups, a human chief engineer on the USS Cerritos. Several other minor ensign characters are introduced in the episode as well.

In an interview, McMahan stated that the mission of more unimportant Starfleet spaceships like the USS Cerritos was to establish connections like second contact, where after the main Starfleet ships have done their job, they go in and find "all the good places to eat [and set up] the communications stuff" The score for "Second Contact" is provided by Hulu's Solar Opposites composer Chris Westlake.

Release 
The episode was released on August 6, 2020, on CBS All Access, before the streaming service provider rebranded to Paramount+ in March 2021, as the series premiere. After each episode premiered in the United States on CBS All Access, episodes would stream on Bell Media on Canada the same day, as well as on other English and French streaming services. The episode was also released on YouTube on August 13, 2020, Internationally. The opening scene was revealed at the Comic-Con@Home convention panel.

Critical reception 
On Rotten Tomatoes, the first season holds a 67% approval rating with an average rating of 7.10/10, based on 45 reviews. The site's critical consensus reads, "Fun, but not very bold, Lower Decks flips the script on Star Trek regulation just enough to stand out in the franchise, if not the greater animation landscape." Other reviews on the site also rated the episode from one to five stars out of five, with one by Burt Peterson of the SiFiNow saying that the episode "has a heart and a moral message that is recognizably Star Trek, even if there's more silliness and profanity than we're used to." 

Comparing the series to Matt Groening's Futurama, Robert Lloyd of the Los Angeles Times said "it’s real science-fiction rooted in the absurdities and self-seriousness of the genre" and that it, "at [its] heart, [is] not a spoof, in which the day is always saved and every comical humiliation leads to a reconciliation or redemption, and it honors the franchise with studiously canonical callbacks and name-drops," commenting on the series' multiple references to previous Star Trek content, including even featuring the god-like entity Q in the season one episode "Veritas". The Spool writer Clint Worthington said "the Rick and Morty vibe takes a lot of getting used to, but there are glimmers of self-referential promise in the latest Star Trek adventure."

Keith DeCandido of Tor.com criticized the animation style, calling it "a far cry from what Walt Disney, Chuck Jones, and Hanna-Barbera had been doing three decades before" and saying that the episode was "about 60% good." DeCandido said that the opening had the potential to be "brilliant," but the show "[got] in its own way too much by trying too hard to be funny." John Orquiola of Screen Rant said enjoyed the plot of the episode, saying that the idea of second contact was "actually an interesting concept for a [Star Trek] show to explore." "does not shy away from or work to reimagine or 'modernize' certain elements of Star Trek’s history. Instead, it revels in what has come before," noted Star Trek review forum website Trek Core on the topic of "Second Contact". The site also praised Newsome's performance of Beckett Mariner in the episode. Tom Chang of Bleeding Cool said that "it's the kind of underdog show that wins you over," as well as calling it "familiar."

Aftershow 
"Second Contact" was reviewed in the aftershow The Ready Room, hosted by Wil Wheaton, under the title "Premiere Special". The special is the first episode out of three of The Ready Room's four current seasons. Series creators Mike McMahan and Barry Kelly made guest appearances in the episode, while series stars like Newsome and Quaid appeared in later episodes.

References

External links 

 "Second Contact" on Rotten Tomatoes

2020 television episodes
Star Trek episodes
Star Trek: Lower Decks
American television series premieres